Barbara Helena Preißler, Preissler or Preisler, married Oeding (born on 12 June 1707 in Nuremberg and died in 1758 in Braunschweig) was a German miniature painter and copper engraver, as well as creator of objects in ivory, wax and alabaster, and a poet.

Biography 
Barbara Helena Preisler was the daughter of the master painter Johann Daniel Preisler in Nürnberg, who also taught her to paint.

In 1729, she married the painter Philipp Wilhelm Oeding (1697-1781), a pupil of her father who later joined the Braunschweig Court.

She made various copper etchings, mainly topographical views, as well as objects in ivory, wax and alabaster.

As a poet, she was a member of the Pegnesischer Blumenorden (Pegnitz Flower Society or in latin: Societas Florigera ad Pegnesum), a German literary society founded in Nuremberg in 1644 by the poet Georg Philipp Harsdörffer. She adopted the name the Alanturum flower or Elecampane (Alantwurz or Inula helenium).

Bibliography 
 Grieb, Manfred, Nürnberger Künstlerlexikon, Munich, 2007, volume 3, page 1171.
 Hamburgisches Künstler-Lexikon, vol. 1 : Die bildenden Künstler 1854, page 181

References 

1707 births
1758 deaths
18th-century German painters